MV Brandanger delivered in 1949 was a general purpose cargo ship, previously owned by the Norwegian shipping company Westfal-Larsen and sold in 1971 to become the school ship MV Petar Beron in Varna, Bulgaria. She was scrapped at Aliaga on 16 January 2015.

References

External links 
 About MV Brandanger, from the website sjohistorie.no (Norwegian
 Photo of MV Brandanger, from city of Vancouver

Merchant ships of Norway
Merchant ships of Bulgaria
Training ships
1948 ships
Ships built on the River Wear